Quality Dairy Company is a family-owned dairy, bakery, and retail/convenience store chain in the Lansing, Michigan metro area. The first Quality Dairy Store was opened in 1936 and as of 2020 there are 27 Mid-Michigan area retail locations. Quality Dairy Company's headquarters is located near REO Town in Lansing and operates its Dairy Plant and Bakery Plant from central Lansing as well.

Quality Dairy has been one of Mid-Michigan's largest employers for over 50 years and produces over 150 different products in its Lansing area facilities.

The chain caters primarily to neighborhood clientele, many of whom do not have the benefit of personal transportation. Quality Dairy draws customers with "loss leader" prices on staples such as milk, eggs and bread, but makes its profits from sales of alcoholic beverages, tobacco products, snack foods and beverages, lottery tickets, and other convenience items sold at premium prices.

History
Quality Dairy Company was founded in March 1936 by Gregory J. Martin and Harvey Mack. The first store was located at 1406 South Washington Avenue. The original company mission included providing bottled milk on a cash and carry basis from small neighborhood milk stores. The price of milk at the time was seven cents a quart.

In 1940, Quality Dairy Company started producing, distributing, and selling ice cream. Since then, the stores have expanded offerings including grocery items, adding cereals, soups, canned vegetables and fruits, snacks and more, along with a selection of meat, cheese and frozen food items. Dipped ice cream was added in 1969.

In 1955, Quality Dairy Company’s ownership changed. Harvey Mack sold to Gregory J. Martin who brought in three additional family owners shortly thereafter.

Currently Quality Dairy Company operates 27 stores throughout Greater Lansing. All but two locations sell beer and wine and sixteen locations sell packaged liquor. Seven locations offer gasoline and six stores have laundromats.

In addition to retail stores, Quality Dairy Company operates it's central production and distribution facility, QD Central which includes it's Bakery, Commissary and Deli Distribution Center. 

In 2017, the Holt location was temporarily closed because of an electrical fire. The store was renovated with a streamlined design and drive-thru window, patio, walk-up window, and arctic beer cave among other new features.  The store re-opened in August 2019.

Dairy Plant

Quality Dairy Company was founded when there were a large number of dairies in Ingham County. Today, the company distributes milk from the local dairy farms to its 27 stores daily. The company also produces flavored milks, juices, fruit drinks, chip dip, and more, all of which are distributed from its central hub, Quality Dairy Central, located just south of Lansing's REO Town. The company also offers its own brand of Premium Ice Creams in a variety of flavors.

Quality Dairy Bakery Plant

The Quality Dairy Bakery started in 1970 in the back room of one of the stores. When the Bakery outgrew the space it moved to a larger location. Today, the Bakery is housed in a 37,000 sq. ft. facility in Lansing. The Quality Dairy Commissary operates in the same facility.

The Bakery produces over 40 varieties of donuts, including classic cake donuts and yeast raised varieties. It also offer cookies, muffins, pastries, and other baked goods.

Customers can also order Bakery products online and have their order delivered to any retail store.

Quality Dairy Commissary

The Quality Dairy Commissary was founded in the mid-1970s.  It is currently operating in the same modern 37,000 sq. ft. facility as the Bakery.

The Commissary provides a wide variety of food items to the stores five days a week.  It produces over three dozen varieties of sandwiches as well as wraps and salads.  The Commissary also supplies the stores with a selection of fresh produce.

References

Convenience stores of the United States
1936 establishments in Michigan
Family-owned companies of the United States